The United States Armed Forces Chess Championship is a chess tournament held annually since 1960.

U.S. Armed Forces Chess Championship

The first U.S. Armed Forces Chess Championship (USAFCC) was held in 1960, and continued uninterrupted through 1993. After 1993, the support of the U.S. Department of Defense was withdrawn. From 1994 through 2001, the American Chess Foundation and the U.S. Chess Center collaborated to host an open Swiss replacement event, the U.S. Armed Forces Open Chess Championship (USAFOCC).

When the Department of Defense resumed support of chess in 2001 with the Inter-Service Chess Championship, the military committee of US Chess took over the open Swiss which continues to be held each year as the U.S. Armed Forces Chess Championship.

Most frequent champions

IM Emory Tate won the Armed Forces Chess Championship five times in 1983, 1984, and three times in a row in 1987 through 1989. Robert Keough has also won five times in 1999, 2000, 2009; 2008 (tied), and 2013.

In 2018, Larry Larkins won his sixth Armed Forces Chess Championship.

Tournament champions since 1960

{| class="sortable wikitable"
! # !! Year !! Winner !! Notes
|-
| 1 || 1960 || Air Force Captain John Hudson and Army SP4 Arthur Feuerstein tied for 1st place. || The first U.S. Armed Forces Chess Championship (USAFCC) was held at the American Legion Hall of Flags in Washington, D.C. There were 12 invited participants. Feuerstein was four times New York state champion. Hudson was a bombardier-navigator on B-52 bombers and a former US Amateur champion.
|-
| 2 || 1961 || Captain John Hudson || The tournament was sponsored by the US Chess Federation, the American Chess Foundation, and the USO.
|-
| 3 || 1962 || SP4 Roy Mallett ||
|-
| 4 || 1963 || Air Force Chief Master Sergeant Irwin Lyon || This was the first year that the Coast Guard was represented in this annual event.
|-
| 5 || 1964 || Air Force 1st Lieutenant Donato Rivera de Jesus || He played for Puerto Rico in the Varna Chess Olympiad in 1962.
|-
| 6 || 1965 || Air Force Airman David Lees (1943-1996) || He also won the Texas State Championship in 1965. The event was held at the American Legion's Hall of Flags in Washington, D.C.
|-
| 7 || 1966 || Army SP4 Chester Wozney ||
|-
| 8 || 1967 || Army SP4 Michael Senkiewicz || He was also a world class Scrabble player, backgammon player, and poker player. He played for the British Virgin Islands in the 1988 chess Olympiad, scoring 9 out of 12. He was once ranked 35th in the nation in chess.
|-
| 9 || 1968 || Army Private First Class Charles "Charlie" Powell (1944-1991) || He was 7-time Virginia champion and beat Bobby Fischer in a simul.
|-
| 10 || 1969 || Army PFC Steven Hohensee ||
|-
| 11 || 1970 || Air Force Major John Hudson ||
|-
| 12 || 1971 || Air Force 1st Lieutenant Brendan Godfrey || Now Dr. Godfrey is Director of the Air Force Office of Scientific Research.
|-
| 13 || 1972 || Coast Guard Lieutenant Zaccarias Chavez || He appeared on the front cover of the December 1972 issue of Chess Life & Review.
|-
| 14 || 1973 || Air Force Sergeant Don Sutherland || He won the California State Chess Championship in 1965 and Colorado Championship in 1973.
|-
| 15 || 1974 || Air Force Sergeant Richard Bustamante ||
|-
| 16 || 1975 || Air Force Sergeant Charles Unruh ||
|-
| 17 || 1976 || Army E4 Russell Garber ||
|-
| 18 || 1977 || Air Force Captain Robert Bond ||
|-
| 19 || 1978 || Air Force Captain Robert Bond || The event was held at the American Legion Hall of Flags in Washington, D.C. The event was sponsored by the American Chess Foundation.
|-
| 20 || 1979 || Army SP4 Michael Fletcher || He is a national master.
|-
| 21 || 1980 || Army SP4 Michael Fletcher ||
|-
| 22 || 1981 || Airman 1st Class Timothy Brown || He won the Arizona championship in 1976.
|-
| 23 || 1982 || Air Force Sergeant Timothy Brown ||
|-
| 24 || 1983 || Air Force Senior Airman Emory Tate, Jr. ||
|-
| 25 || 1984 || Air Force Sergeant Emory Tate ||
|-
| 26 || 1985 || Army SP4 Roberto Rodriquez ||
|-
| 27 || 1986 || Army Private Richard Russell ||
|-
| 28 || 1987 || Air Force Staff Sergeant Emory Tate ||
|-
| 29 || 1988 || Air Force Staff Sergeant Emory Tate ||
|-
| 30 || 1989 || Air Force Staff Sergeant Emory Tate ||
|-
| 31 || 1990 || Mario Murillo (Navy) ||
|-
| 32 || 1991 || Mario Murillo (Navy) ||
|-
| 33 || 1992 || Donato Lacno (Navy) ||
|-
| 34 || 1993 || Air Force Sergeant Elvin Wilson ||
|-
| 35 || 1994 || Robert Holling (Navy) ||
|-
| 36 || 1995 || John Hanson and Brian Richardson tied for 1st ||
|-
| 37 || 1996 || Army Captain David Hater ||
|-
| 38 || 1997 || Army Major David Hater and Dwaine Roberts (Marines Corps) tied for 1st ||
|-
| 39 || 1998 || Air Force Sergeant Elvin Wilson and Air Force Sergeant Peter Kurucz ties for 1st ||
|-
| 40 || 1999 || Air Force Sergeant Robert Keough ||
|-
| 41 || 2000 || Air Force Sergeant Robert Keough ||
|-
| 42 || 2001 || Sgt Rudy Tia and Joseph Kruml tied for 1st || The tournament was held at Ft. Meyer.
|-
| 43 || 2002 || Sgt Rudy Tia || The event took place in San Diego, CA.
|-
| 44 || 2003 || Air Force Sergeant Leroy Hill || The tournament was held at Kelly AFB in San Antonio, Texas.
|-
| 45 || 2004 || Narcisco Victoria and West Point Cadet David Jacobs tied for first || 
|-
| 46 || 2005 || West Point Cadet David Jacobs || The tournament was held in Arlington, Virginia.
|-
| 47 || 2006 || West Point Cadet David Jacobs || The tournament was held at the US Armed Forces Retirement Home in Washington, DC.  Retired USAF Lt. General William Earl Brown, a chessplayer who was in one of the Tuskegee Airman graduating classes in the late 1940s, was a special guest and speaker.
|-
| 48 || 2007 || Navy retiree Larry Larkins || The tournament was held in Arlington, VA from October 6-8.
|-
| 49 || 2008 || Larkins, Taffinder, Keough, Pabalan, and Szpisjak tied for first || The tournament was held in Bethesda, MA. 
|-
| 50 || 2009 || USAF TSgt Robert Keough || The tournament was held at Gettysburg, PA.
|-
This was the first time the event was held on a ship.
|-
| 54 || 2013 || Dan Ranario, Robert Keough, Gordon Randall, and Jon Middaugh tied for first || The tournament was held at the U.S. Army Transportation Museum at Fort Eustis, Virginia.
|-
| 55 || 2014 || US Army Nicholas Oblak || The tournament was held at the Air Force Academy in Colorado Springs.
|-
| 56 || 2015 || Navy retiree Larry Larkins || The tournament was held at Fort Belvoir, Virginia USO Center from October 10-12. 
|-
| 57 || 2016 || Navy retiree Larry Larkins || The tournament was held at US Naval Academy, Annapolis, MD.
|-
| 58 || 2017 || Leroy Hill, Jr. (USAF, Retired) || The tournament was hosted at the United States Military Academy at West Point, and sponsored by the US Chess Trust and US Chess president, Mike Hoffpauir, a former US Army brigade commander. Hill also won the Inter-Service Championship in 2003.
|-
| 59 || 2018 || Navy retiree Larry Larkins || Larry Larkins won on tiebreaks. The tournament was held at Joint Base Andrews, MD.
|-
| 60 || 2019 || Air Force 1st Lieutenant and National Master Eigen Wang || The tournament was held at Camp Lejeune, NC.
|-
| 61 || 2020 || Navy Second Class Petty Officer Andrew Peraino || The tournament was held in Virginia Beach, VA. 
|-
| 62 || 2021 || Airman 1st Class Charles Unruh || Unruh won the tournament in Grapevine, Texas, October 8-11, 2021. 
|-
| 63 || 2022 || U.S. Military Academy Cadet Addison Lee || Lee won the tournament on Joint Base McGuire-Dix-Lakehurst, NJ, October 8-10, 2022.
|}

Inter-Service Chess Championship

In 2001, the U.S. Department of Defense resumed support of chess in the US military and the US Armed Forces Chess Championship (USAFCC) was renamed the U.S. Inter-Service Chess Championship (ISCC).

References

External links

 US Armed Forces Chess
 
 Armed Forces Chess

Chess in the United States
Chess competitions